Wootton is a large village and civil parish located to the southwest of Bedford, in the north of Bedfordshire, England. The parish also includes the hamlets of Hall End, Keeley Green and Wootton Green.

History 
Wootton has had a long association with brick-making, but is now mainly a dormitory community for Bedford and Milton Keynes. In the 18th century church bells were made here for several churches in Bedfordshire and adjoining counties. There has been a great deal of residential development over the last 30 years but some attractive old timber-framed houses still survive. The Church of St Mary the Virgin in the village is mainly 14th century but contains two fine monuments in the chancel to members of the Monoux family who died in 1685 and 1707. To the west of the church is Wootton House, an impressive late 17th-century house with a contemporary, red brick stable block.

Demography
The Domesday Book of 1086, listed Wootton as having 26 residents (20 villagers and six slaves) across ten hides. By 1901, the population had risen to 1,252. The population remained fairly steady throughout the first half of the 20th century. But by 1971, the population had climbed to 2,386, a 35.61% (1010 residents) increase within ten years. By 2001 that figure was 4,230.

According to the 2011 Census, the area covered by Wootton civil parish had 4,156 residents who lived in 1,654 households. The median age of the population is 44. Of these residents, 83% describe their health as "good" or "very good" and 2.6% of economically active people aged 16–74 were unemployed.

Village expansion
Wootton is currently expanding in size.

Housing plans include:
 More than 1000 new houses on fields situated next to the A421 road.
 Possible plans to build another 1000 houses on fields located on the road between the village and Kempston.
 an upper school
 small doctors Surgery 
 three shops 
 Salon
 five Pubs
 football club
 Car Dealership
 Garage
 Office spaces
 elderly Residential Home
 three churches
 library
 fields

Development of Wootton Park as part of the expansion project was led by a consortium of Bovis, Bellway and Taylor Wimpey. ECL Civil Engineering was the sole civil engineering contractor on the 600 homes development south of the village of Wootton.

Sport and leisure

Wootton has a Non-League football team Wootton Blue Cross F.C., founded in 1887. For the 2020–21 season, they are members of the Bedfordshire County Football League Premier Division. Wootton Blue Cross play at Weston Park, that has a capacity of 750. The clubs most successful season came in the 2002–03 season, when they reached the 4th round of the FA Vase.

Public houses in Wootton
 The Fox and Duck
 Cock Inn
 The Legstraps
 The Blue Cross Members Club
 The Cross Keys (Tre Fratelli)

Shops in Wootton
 Tesco Express
 Rumbles Fish & Chips
 Pats Pizza
 Pharmacy
 Wootton Garage
 Medical Health Centre
 Women Salon
 Sainsbury's Local
 Londis / Post Office

Services in Wootton
 Wootton Library
 A number of independent companies 
 A R Security Systems
 All About The Office Ltd
 Assegai Security Solutions
 Asta ay Permanent Make Up
 Bedford Electrical
 Coromel Cakes
 D Young Carpentry Joinery and Renovations
 Dream Digital
 Floral Art By Ronnie
 Foxglove Florals
 Fresh Bites Catering
 Hands in Harmony Home Care Services
 Home Instead Senior Care
 Pin Wizard
 Simms Stuart
 Bizzy Bees Pre-school
 Wootton Vale Retirement Community

Notable residents
 Letitia Dean, EastEnders actress 
 Steve Mattin, automobile designer

Past Residents
 Mathew Scherne, clerk & vicar, fl. 1460

See also
 Wootton Upper School

References

External links

 Wootton Village Website
 2001 Census - Parish Profile for Wootton

Villages in Bedfordshire
Civil parishes in Bedfordshire
Borough of Bedford